Interstate 565 (I-565) is a  Interstate spur that connects I-65 in Decatur with U.S. Route 72 (US 72) in Huntsville in the US state of Alabama.

I-565 serves the cities of Decatur, Madison, and downtown Huntsville. It also provides a route to the Huntsville International Airport. The Interstate forms a part of Appalachian Development Highway System Corridor V. U.S. Route 72 Alternate (US 72 Alt.) travels concurrently with I-565 for its entire length.

Route description
I-565's connection with the rest of the Interstate Highway System occurs at its western terminus, at an interchange with I-65. The interchange was extant prior to I-565's construction; it served State Route 20 (SR 20), which previously extended eastward into Huntsville. (The interchange was rebuilt and improved as part of the I-565 construction.) From the interchange, I-565 takes a brief northerly swing to bypass the town of Mooresville before joining and subsuming the former right-of-way of SR 20 through rural southeastern Limestone County. Progressing eastward, as the western edge of the city of Madison it diverges slightly to the south of the former SR 20 route, traveling parallel to it a short distance away. (This portion of the old SR 20 route is now named Madison Boulevard.) In Greenbrier, the route junctions with Greenbrier Road at a parclo interchange and County Line Road, which is among the most congested interchanges in the state. Immediately after the junction with County Line Road, the route enters Madison County and immediately junctions with the main thoroughfare for Huntsville International Airport.

Continuing east, I-565 goes through the southern part of Madison, rejoining the former SR 20 route near the Huntsville–Madison city line. Here, I-565 once again subsumes the old route's right-of-way as it travels along the south edge of Cummings Research Park and the University of Alabama in Huntsville campus and the north edge of Redstone Arsenal. At Governors Drive, I-565 takes a slight turn northward away from the old route and continues through an area generally referred to as "West Huntsville". It enters a  elevated stretch resembling a viaduct, has an interchange with Memorial Parkway just south of University Drive, and then, gradually curving toward the northeast, passes north of downtown Huntsville and through a former cotton mill district. At Oakwood Avenue, it subsumes what was once the easternmost  of Andrew Jackson Way, traveling over Chapman Mountain to its eastern terminus where it joins US 72.

After the completion of I-565, the SR 20 designation was removed from all remaining portions of the former route east of I-65.

History

When the Interstate Highway System was first laid out during the mid-1950s, I-65 was routed on a north–south bee line connecting Nashville, Tennessee, with Birmingham, Alabama. This route passes just to the east of Decatur, which was a major river port on the Tennessee River at the time.

During the late 1950s and through the 1960s, Huntsville underwent massive population growth due to the establishment of the US Army Missile Command at Redstone Arsenal and the new NASA Marshall Space Flight Center. By 1960, Huntsville had grown to be more than twice the size of Decatur. It became clear that an Interstate Highway spur route would be beneficial to connect Huntsville with I-65 and to the rest of the country. I-565 was chosen as the Federal Highway Administration (FHWA)'s number for this proposed spur expressway. It was decided that, rather than terminating at the western edge of Huntsville, I-565 would extend farther eastward, providing an east–west freeway for Huntsville. On the eastern edge of Huntsville, I-565 was designed to feed into US 72, which was being widened to a four-lane highway traveling from Huntsville to Kimball, Tennessee, where it feeds into I-24.

Construction of I-565 began in 1987, and the freeway was opened on October 26, 1991. By the time construction had begun, Huntsville had become one of the most populous cities in the contiguous United States without a freeway connection to the Interstate system. Construction was performed in phases.

Phase 1 opened in 1989 and extended from the east side of Mooresville to County Line Road (exit 7, which was originally constructed to serve as a terminus taking traffic between I-565 and SR 20). At the time, traffic from I-65 still had to drive through Mooresville to where the Interstate started while the Mooresville overpasses and bridges over creeks were constructed.

Phase 2 added a bypass through Madison. The Interstate still ended at County Line Road, requiring traffic to take SR 20 through Madison until about Slaughter Road where a temporary entrance/exit merged traffic back onto I-565. The route then traveled along the old Governors Drive path past the Space and Rocket Center until it terminated with two lanes exiting at what is now the Governors Drive exit. This bypass through Madison allowed construction of the bridges over Zeirdt Road and the earthwork to be done near what is now the golf driving range and for construction of the Wall Triana exit and airport exit. The eastern terminus at Governors Drive was to allow for construction of the elevated sections crossing Memorial Parkway and extending over Pratt and Oakwood to the terminus at US 72.

Phase 3 opened the Interstate from County Line Road to the Governors Drive exit. This gave access via the Airport exit and Wall Triana exit.

Phase 4 was completed in 1991–1992, with the completion of the bridges and overpasses near Mooresville and the Interstate was opened directly from I-65, bypassing the city of Mooresville.

Phase 5 opened the "elevated sections" from Governors Drive to the US 72 intersection. At the time, this intersection with US 72 was no longer Interstate and was controlled by a red-light. This also opened the interchange of I-565 and Memorial Parkway.

When I-565 was first opened, it was signed as a north–south highway. This created some confusion because the highway travels roughly east–west. It was resigned soon after opening. In 1996, the entirety of I-565 was designated the "Admiral Alan B. Shepard Highway" in honor of astronaut Alan Shepard.

Huntsville bus accident

Four teenage girls were killed in the accident.

Recent development
Phase 6 was completed in 2010. This slightly extended I-565 from the then red light at US 72 to the east end and converted the connection with US 72 from an at-grade intersection into a full interchange. This kept traffic going over Chapman Mountain from having to stop at the intersection which created morning and afternoon commuter backups. After this intersection, controlled access officially stops, but the highway is still a four-lane highway and does not require a stop until the red light at the bottom of Chapman Mountain at the Moores Mill intersection.

Work began on Phase 7 in December 2013 to upgrade the interchange of I-565 and County Line Road at exit 7, adding exits and onramps to for access to/from the east. The upgrade was budgeted to cost $30 million with the city of Madison funding $1.7 million of the project. The new interchange added ramps providing access for traffic exiting westbound and entering eastbound, so that the interchange now has a full set of ramps. The exit was reopened with new ramps in April 2015.

Construction of building an intersection at Dunlap Boulevard is currently underway, with the exit being built along with areas around the Toyota Field. The exit is located in between Madison Boulevard and Wall Triana Highway exits. The exit will open in late 2021 or early 2022. The exit was delayed because of the corona virus spreading and construction was delayed by several months. The exit cost will total somewhere around $20 million–30 million when completed.

Future
An extension of I-565 west, from the current terminus at I-65, along the route of SR 20 and US 72 Alt. to its intersection with US 31 near Decatur, is also planned. In January 2007, politicians in Northwestern Alabama announced that they would launch a campaign to extend I-565 westward to Florence. I-565 is part of a proposed highway that would connect Memphis, Tennessee, with Atlanta, Georgia, via Rome, Georgia, and Chattanooga, Tennessee, as part of ISTEA High Priority Corridor 7, with a possible numbering of "Interstate 28".

The Huntsville "5 Year Plan" shows adding additional westbound lane from Maysville Road to Shields Road (cost $9 million in FY2014) and closing the median opening where I-565 terminates into US 72 on Chapman Mountain. This would also include a connector road between Epworth Drive and Maysville Road (cost $5 million FY2014). In addition, "Projects Being Considered" to include additional lanes on I-565 from Wall Triana to County Line Road interchange (cost $60 million) and additional lanes on I-565 from County Line Road interchange to I-65 (cost $60 million).

Exit list

References

External links

Interstate Guide I-565
AA-Roads Corridor V / Corridor 7
AA-Roads Corridor 11

65-5
65-5
5
565
Transportation in Limestone County, Alabama
Transportation in Madison County, Alabama
U.S. Route 72